Woman of Desire is a 1994 erotic thriller film directed by Robert Ginty and starring Bo Derek and Robert Mitchum.

Plot
Jack Lynch (Jeff Fahey) washes up on a beach after a storm, telling a story of one of the Ashby brothers having fallen off the Ashby sailboat, of which Jack was the pilot. The beautiful playgirl Christina Ford (Bo Derek) walks into the hospital and tells police that Jack shot her boyfriend, Ted Ashby (Steven Bauer), and raped her. Jack is arrested and questioned, but he remembers very little. The sailboat is found derelict.

But Ted Ashby had an identical twin brother, Jonathan (also Steven Bauer), who was richer than he. Jonathan insists Jack be prosecuted vigorously. Jack claims he and Christina carried on an affair behind Ted's back and convinces the semi-retired Walter J. Hill (Robert Mitchum) to be his defense lawyer.

Released to Walter's custody, Jack confronts Christina, who claims she's only humoring Jonathan and that she'll change her story in the grand jury hearing. She seduces Jack and gets his fingerprints on a pistol. In the grand jury hearing, Christina double-crosses Jack and continues to claim that Jack shot Ted several times. Additional evidence is introduced, including a pistol with Jack's fingerprints just found on the boat (planted by Christina after their tryst).

Things look very bad for Jack, but then a body identified as Ted Ashby is found—without any bullet wounds. Christina is accused of perjury and recommended for psychiatric evaluation.

It's revealed that Jonathan is actually Ted, as Walter suspected, and that Christina seduced Jack to make him vulnerable to framing. But Christina actually pushed Jonathan overboard during the storm, and Ted assumed his identity to claim his fortune, per their plan. Walter explains the conspiracy to Jack, who becomes furious and steals a pistol. Ted is in the middle of double-crossing Christina and sending her to a mental institution, but a policeman obsessed with Christina shoots and kills Ted in the street before Jack can do it.

Sometime later, Christina has convinced a wealthy psychiatrist at the mental institution she's innocent and made him fall in love with and marry her. Jack is a part of the crew on his sailboat, and Christina invites him to continue their affair.

Cast
 Bo Derek as Christina Ford
 Robert Mitchum as Walter J. Hill
 Jeff Fahey as Jack Lynch
 Steven Bauer as Jonathan Ashby
 Thomas Hall as Norman Landis
 Todd Jensen as Wendell Huston
 John Matshikiza as Det. Lewis Stone
 Warrick Grier as Officer Miller
 Todd Jensen as Wendell Huston
 Michael McCabe as Dr. Richard Brooks
 John Carson as Judge Parker
 Peter Holden as Michael Altman
 Ellia Thompson as Elizabeth Hill
 James Whyle as 1st Officer
 David S. Lee as 3rd Officer (as David Lee)
 Craig Urbani as Arnold Wells
 Mary A. Byron as cast/journalist

References
 Entertainment Celebrities by Norbert B. Laufenberg

External links 
 
 
 
 

1990s English-language films
1993 films
1990s erotic thriller films
American erotic thriller films
1990s American films